Olympias the Herodian was the daughter of Herod the Great and wife Malthace, a Samaritan.  This was Herod's fourth marriage.  Olympias' better known brothers were Herod Archelaus and Herod Antipas.  She married Herod's nephew Joseph ben Joseph and bore him a daughter, Mariamne, who was the first wife of Herod of Chalcis and the mother of Aristobulus of Chalcis.

References

1st-century BC women
Herodian dynasty
Samaritan culture and history
Herod the Great
Ancient Jewish women